Aklan Polytechnic College is a private educational institution in Kalibo, Aklan, Philippines. It was established primarily as  a maritime school but at present it already offers nursing, business, and other courses. It has recently offered tourism management course starting 2014-2015

School names
1987-2007: Aklan Polytechnic Institute
2007–Present: Aklan Polytechnic College

Departments
 Secondary/High School
 Tertiary/College
 BS in Business Administration
 BS in Computer Engineering
 BS in Computer Science
 BS in Customs Administration
 BS in Marine Engineering
 BS in Marine Transportation
 BS in Nursing
The College was able to produce numerous topnotchers in their various courses, Mr. Arren Mado (Top 8) Nurse Licensure Examination November 2015, Capt. Rommel Sison (Top 1)Master Mariner Examination, Capt. Godofredo Mortel, to name the few. Way back 2008, the college of Nursing was recognized by the Commission on Higher Education (CHED) as one of the top performing nursing school in the Philippines by the number of passing percentage in the Nurse Licensure Examination.

The College of Nursing is considered as one of the toughest course in the college because of the standards set and implemented. The passing grade for every subject is 81 and the student has to maintain this in order to stay in the college until they graduate. Presently, the Dean of the College is Mrs. Elvie Abello Imason-Ramos, MN, MAN, RN and most of its faculty are master's degree holder in Nursing and some are licensed teacher.

Campus
 Main - Quezon Avenue, Kalibo, Aklan
 Tambak Campus - Tambak, New Washington, Aklan

See also
 List of schools in Kalibo

External links
 Aklan Polytechnic College - Tambak Campus

References

Universities and colleges in Aklan